Julio Duboc (c. 1800 – c. 1860) was one of five interim mayors of Ponce, Puerto Rico, during the period of 14 February 1854 to 24 July 1854.  The other four interim mayors during that six-month period were Escolástico Fuentes, Pablo Manfredi, José Benito Paz Falcón, and Antonio E. Molina.

Introduction to politics
Duboc had performed as Deputy Mayor ("Segundo Alcalde") under  mayor José de Jesús Fernández in the 1846. The position was the result of the new Decreto Orgánico de 1846 (1846 Organic Decree), a new Law for Municipalities that allowed for increased centralization of public administration and greater political control over municipalities. Despite this lack of full political control at the municipal level, the former job allowed Duboc to gain administrative experience for his work as mayor.

See also

 List of Puerto Ricans
 List of mayors of Ponce, Puerto Rico

References

Mayors of Ponce, Puerto Rico
1800s births
1860s deaths
Year of birth uncertain
Year of death uncertain